Langhorne Cowles Sias (born 1959) is an American politician who represented House District 27 in the Colorado House of Representatives. A vacancy committee appointed Sias to the office after his predecessor resigned, and he was sworn into office on February 4, 2015. A Republican, he was subsequently elected to the office in the November, 2016 general election.

Sias was the unsuccessful Republican nominee for lieutenant governor and running mate of Walker Stapleton in the 2018 Colorado gubernatorial election.

Education 
Lang holds a J.D. from the University of Michigan Law School, a Master of Science from the London School of Economics, and a Bachelor of Arts from Vassar College. He has practiced law in the past.

Military service
Sias served in the United States Navy as a fighter pilot and Topgun instructor. He achieved the rank of Lieutenant colonel. He later served in the Air National Guard.

Personal
Sias lives in Arvada, Colorado with his wife and three children. He works as a 777 pilot for FedEx.

2022 state treasurer campaign

In November 2021, Sias announced his candidacy for Colorado State Treasurer. On November 8, 2022, he lost to incumbent Democrat Dave Young in the 2022 general election.

References

External links
Official page at the Colorado General Assembly
Campaign site

21st-century American politicians
1959 births
Alumni of the London School of Economics
Aviators from Colorado
Living people
Republican Party members of the Colorado House of Representatives
People from Arvada, Colorado
People from Wilton, Connecticut
University of Michigan Law School alumni
Vassar College alumni
Candidates in the 2018 United States elections
Candidates in the 2022 United States elections